Cycling at the 2021 Islamic Solidarity Games was held in Konya, Turkey from 5 to 13 August 2022 in Konya Velodrome. The Road Cycling events of the competitions were held on various routes in Konya and the Track Cycling events were held at the Konya Velodrome.

The Games were originally scheduled to take place from 20 to 29 August 2021 in Konya, Turkey. In May 2020, the Islamic Solidarity Sports Federation (ISSF), who are responsible for the direction and control of the Islamic Solidarity Games, postponed the games as the 2020 Summer Olympics were postponed to July and August 2021, due to the global COVID-19 pandemic.

Medalists

Road

Men

Women

Track

Men

Women

Medal table

Participating nations
A total of 122 athletes from 18 nations competed in cycling at the 2021 Islamic Solidarity Games:

References

External links 
Official website
Results book – Track cycling

2021 Islamic Solidarity Games
2022 in road cycling
2022 in track cycling
International cycle races hosted by Turkey
2021